Lafayette Towers Apartments West, at 1321 Orleans Street in Detroit, Michigan, is one of two identical apartment buildings designed by Ludwig Mies van der Rohe. The other is Lafayette Towers Apartments East.

The apartment is in the Lafayette Park development, near downtown. Both the Lafayette Towers Apartments were built in 1963 and stand at 22 stories in height. They were designed in the International style of architecture, much like the Lafayette Pavilion Apartments, and the other buildings in the development. The primary materials for the facades are aluminium and glass.

Lafayette Park development
This is of four towers in the Lafayette Park development. The others are the Windsor Tower, the Lafayette Pavilion Apartments, and Lafayette Towers Apartments West.

Along with the other neighboring Mies van der Rohe-designed buildings in the Lafayette Park development, these buildings were added to the National Register of Historic Places in 1996.

External links
 Google Maps location of the Lafayette Towers Apartments. Tower West is to the left, while Tower East is to the right.
 
 

Apartment buildings in Detroit
Ludwig Mies van der Rohe buildings
Residential skyscrapers in Detroit
1960s architecture in the United States
International style architecture in Michigan
Modernist architecture in Michigan